Stade Municipal de Parakou is a multi-use stadium in Parakou, Benin.  It is currently used mostly for football matches and is the home ground of Dynamo Unacob FC de Parakou and Buffles du Borgou FC of the Benin Premier League.  The stadium has a capacity of 8,000 spectators.

References

External links
 Stadium information

Football venues in Benin